Jakub Jesionkowki (born 7 March 1989) is a Polish football player, most recently playing in England for League Two team Swindon Town.

Club career

Zagłębie Lubin
Jesionkowski began his footballing career as a teenager at his local football club, Olimpia Poznań but left to attend the MSP Szamotuły Football Academy, a football centre that specialises in goalkeeping.

After leaving MSP Szamotuły, Jesionkowski joined Ekstraklasa outfit Zagłębie Lubin in 2006. He got his first match experience as a late substitute for Michal Václavík in the 3–0 Ekstraklasa Cup victory over Górnik Zabrze in December 2006.

Jesionkowski failed to break into the first team side throughout the remainder of the 2006–07 season, but continued to play the occasional Ekstraklasa Cup game including the full 90 minutes of Lubin's second victory of the season over Górnik Zabrze. He also played the final 17 minutes of the Quarter-Final loss to Dyskobolia Grodzisk Wielkopolski, replacing Mariusz Liberda.

During the following 2007–08 season, Jesionkowski played mainly reserve or youth team football for the 'Miedziowi'. However, he did earn his full competitive debut for the first team against Lech Poznań. The game finished 1–0 to Lech Poznań after an injury time winner by Paweł Wasilewski.

He spent his final season playing for the Zagłębie II Lubin in III Liga Polska. Jesionkowski was sent-off after only nine minutes against Wulkan/MKS Oława, but kept eight clean sheets during the 22 appearances he played throughout the campaign.

Swindon Town
On 31 July 2009, Jesionkowski left Zagłębie Lubin to sign a two-year deal with English League One outfit Swindon Town. His signature meant that Swindon would be employing four goalkeepers during the 2009–10 season alongside David Lucas, Phil Smith and youth graduate Mark Scott.

He was unable to find a way into Swindon's first team throughout his debut season. However, when Danny Wilson rested Lucas or if he was injured, Jesionkowski acted as cover on the substitutes bench for the league games at the County Ground against Colchester United, Oldham Athletic and Norwich City. Also, the away fixtures in League One at Southend United and Southampton and the cup games against Woking in the FA Cup and Norwich City in the Football League Trophy.

Jesionkowski did contribute towards Swindon Town's Wiltshire Premier Shield success during the 2009–10 campaign. He played in the Semi-Final First Leg win over Salisbury City but was an unused substitute as Town beat fellow Swindon based club Swindon Supermarine 2–0 in the Final.

International career
Jesionkowski has represented his native Poland at youth international level playing for the Under-19's while playing for Zagłębie Lubin.

Honours
 Wiltshire Premier Shield: 2010

References

External links
 

Living people
Footballers from Poznań
1989 births
Polish footballers
Swindon Town F.C. players
Association football goalkeepers